Marc John Jefferies is an American actor known for his roles in Losing Isaiah, Get Rich or Die Tryin', Power, The Haunted Mansion, Nerve, Stuart Little 2, Brown Sugar and Notorious.

Career
Jefferies began his career as child model, then actor. His first major film role was in Losing Isaiah, opposite Halle Berry. Jefferies had roles throughout his childhood, and continued his work as an adult, including the films Get Rich or Die Tryin', Notorious. and Brotherly Love. Some of his most notable television roles are Darius on Treme and QDubs on Power. Marc John Jefferies founded the MJJ Acting Academy where he trains actors to discover their own unique acting style.

Filmography

Film
Losing Isaiah (1995) - Isaiah
Stuart Little 2 (2002) - Will Wilson
Brown Sugar (2002) - Young Dre
Friday After Next (2002) - Kid (Uncredited)
Finding Nemo (2003) - (voice)
Charlie's Angels: Full Throttle (2003) - Bus-Stop Kid
The Haunted Mansion (2003) - Michael Evers
Spider-Man 2 (2004) - Amazed Kid #1
Get Rich or Die Tryin' (2005) - Young Marcus
Keeping Up with the Steins (2006) - Tim
Notorious (2009) - Lil' Cease
Brotherly Love (2015) - Bunch
Supermodel (2015) - Shucky
Nerve (2016) - Wes
Chocolate City: Vegas Strip (2017) - Carlton
13th and Pine (2022) - Tony

Television
New York Undercover (1995) - Kevin Wolfred
Cosby (1997) - Davy
Homicide: Life on the Street (1997) - Jack Collins
Trinity (1998) - Kid #2
Law & Order: Special Victims Unit (2000) - Jonathan
The Practice (2001) - Jason Lees
Third Watch (2002) - Miguel White
Stuart Little (2003) - Will Wilson (voice)
The Tracy Morgan Show (2003-2004) - Derrick Mitchell
Justice League Unlimited (2004) - Young Green Lantern (voice)
Fatherhood (2004-2005) - Roy Bindlebeep
ER (2005) - Victor Hopkins
3 lbs (2006) - Adam
Dexter (2008) - Wendell Owens
Treme (2010) - Darius
Law & Order: Special Victims Unit (2012) - Hasdrubal
Power (2015) - QDubs

References

External links
 

Living people
African-American male actors
American male child actors
American male film actors
American male television actors
Male actors from New York City
21st-century African-American people
Year of birth missing (living people)